Tim Louis  (born 1969) is a Canadian Liberal politician and musician first elected as a Member of Parliament in the House of Commons of Canada to represent the federal riding Kitchener—Conestoga  during the 2019 Canadian federal election, defeating incumbent Harold Albrecht.

Music
Born in New Jersey, Louis is a jazz singer and pianist. He began playing the piano at five, eventually studying and graduating in 1991 with a Bachelor of Arts degree in music from Rutgers University, where he studied under jazz pianist Kenny Barron. After graduation Louis pursued further study in elementary education and, at the same time, a music career, playing with an Italian wedding band and a touring rock and roll band, Soul Engines, that opened for bands including Hootie and the Blowfish but whose debut album produced by Teo Macero was scuttled when its independent label folded.

Louis then relocated to his future spouse's native Kitchener, in [1994], and married on September 21, 1995. He toured with Canadian country music artists including Lace and Jamie Warren, with whom he won a 2002 SOCAN Songwriter of the Year award for the single Sunny Day in the Park, and later recorded a series of jazz albums including Til it be Tomorrow (2006), Untrue (2009), Snowflakes in Bloom (2010), Snapshots (2012), and Bittersweet (2019). Between 2012 and 2019 Louis hosted a jazz radio program, Tim's Jazz Sessions, on Centre Wellington station CICW-FM, based on which he also developed two pilot television episodes.

Politics

In 2015, Louis ran unsuccessfully against Conservative incumbent Harold Albrecht, who had held the seat since 2006. During the following election, in 2019, Louis unseated Albrecht, but was not confirmed as the winner in his electoral district until the next morning. Clerical errors in five polls prevented them from being opened and counted for over 12 hours. He previously ran for the seat in 2015, losing to Albrecht. Louis told CBC News that based his victory in 2019 from a greater understanding of his riding particularity the townships in the riding compared to 2015 and cited issues such as  affordability, climate change, and health care. He was re-elected to a second term in 2021.

Since his election, Louis has served on numerous parliamentary committees, including the COVID-19 Pandemic, Canadian Heritage, and Agriculture and Afri-Food committees.

Electoral record

References

External links

1969 births
Living people
Canadian jazz musicians
Liberal Party of Canada MPs
Rutgers University alumni
Members of the House of Commons of Canada from Ontario
American emigrants to Canada
Musicians from Kitchener, Ontario
21st-century Canadian politicians
21st-century Canadian male musicians